The Sultanate of Sarawak was a traditional Malay kingdom, located in present-day Kuching Division, Sarawak. The kingdom was founded in 1599, after the invasion of the preceding Santubong Kingdom and the later Sultanate of Brunei. It witnessed the reign of a sole sultan, Sultan Tengah, Prince of Brunei, known as Ibrahim Ali Omar Shah Ibni Sultan Muhammad Hassan of Sarawak. The state established a close relationship with Brunei and Johor. It forged dynastic rules with the surrounding Malay kingdoms in western Borneo including the Sultanates of Sambas, Sukadana and Tanjungpura-Matan. The kingdom was dissolved following Sultan Tengah's assassination in 1641. The administration of the territory was then replaced by the local Malay governors appointed from Brunei, reunifying the area into Brunei prior to the White Rajah era.

History

Origin 
According to the Salahsilah Raja-Raja Brunei (Bruneian Royal Annals), the state was established following the demise of Sultan Muhammad Hassan, the monarch of the Bruneian Empire who ruled between 1582 and 1598. The death of the sultan witnessed the enthronement of Abdul Jalilul Akbar, the eldest prince of Muhammad Hassan as the Sultan of Brunei. However, the crowning of Abdul Jalil Akbar was objected by Pengiran Muda Tengah, claiming that the status of Abdul Jalilul was invalid as the elder prince was born before their father become the sultan, in contrast to the Pengiran who was born after his father's ascension to the throne, hence he believed that he had the superior right to inherit the kingdom.

Already anticipating this dispute, the newly crowned Sultan of Brunei appointed the Pengiran Muda Tengah as the Sultan of Sarawak, a frontier territory far from the central core of the Bruneian kingdom. The departure of the Pengiran was accompanied by more than 1,000 soldiers from the Sakai, Kedayan, and Bunut tribes, all who are natives of Borneo. A coterie of Bruneian nobility also followed him to develop the administration system in the new kingdom. Today, a number of Kuching and the Sambas Malay community are able to trace their origin from these pioneers.

The new sultan constructed a fortified palace in Sungai Bedil, Santubong, turning the area into the royal, judicial and administrate capital of the kingdom. He began to appoint his deputies and delegates, incorporating the position of Datu Seri Setia, Datu Shahbandar Indera Wangsa, Datu Amar Setia Diraja and Datuk Temenggong Laila Wangsa into the governance system. He was proclaimed sultan after completing the administration system of the new kingdom, bearing the regal name of Sultan Ibrahim Ali Omar Shah. According to the Sambas Royal records, Sultan Tengah Manga was known as Sultan Abdul Jalil.

Sarawak–Johor diplomatic crisis 
Sometime in the early 17th century, Sultan Tengah was on a trip to Pahang, (then an autonomous-kingdom in Johor) to visit his aunt, the Raja Bonda (Queen Creek of Pahang). Before he left, he elected four Datuks (nobleman) to administer his kingdom. His aunt was married to the sultan, Abdul Ghafur Muhiuddin Shah. While in Johor, he was invited to perform in a courtly dance. It was during the performance that one of the dancers almost hit the face of Sultan Tengah with a handkerchief by accident. The furious Sultan Tengah then slapped the dancer. This caused a disappointment in the Sultan of Pahang who then ordered the Sarawakian royal entourage to immediately leave his kingdom.

However, based on the narration of the Sultanate of Sambas, Sultan Tengah was ordered to leave Johor because of his refusal to marry Princess Cik Zohra upon the request of his aunt, The Queen Consort of Pahang.

Sarawak–Sukadana alliance 
The royal entourage was hit by a major storm during their return voyage to Borneo. The vessel was then blew off course and arrived to the shores of the Sukadana Kingdom. The polity of Sukadana was ruled by a Javanese Hindu King, Penambahan Giri Mustika, he was later known as Sultan Muhammad Saifuddin after his conversion to Islam by Sheikh Shamsuddin, a missionary from Mecca. It was also during his time in Sukadana that Sultan Tengah commenced his religious studies under the guidance of Sheikh Shamsuddin.

The Sultan later wedded Princess Puteri Surya Kesuma, sister of the reigning monarch. He also briefly settled in Sukadana and requested permission to carry out missionary activities on the local populace. His request was permitted and he was granted land around the Sambas river to perform his duties. By 1600, he departed Sukadana to Sambas together with an entourage of 40 vessels consisting of armed men.

The royal entourage arrived and built a settlement around Kuala Bangun, near the Sambas river. It was during this time in Sambas that the Puteri gave birth to a prince, Radin Sulaiman. She later gave birth to: Pengiran Badaruddin (would later become Pengiran Bendahara Seri Maharaja) and Pengiran Abdul Wahab (Pengiran Temenggong Jaya Kesuma).

Sarawak–Sambas union 

Located further up of the Sambas River, The sultan's arrival in Kota Lama was greatly celebrated by the Ratu Sapundak, the King of Kota Lama who welcomed the sultan as the royal guest of honour. The king allowed Sultan Tengah to perform his missionary activities to the local populace, despite himself being a Hindu ruler of Majapahit descent. The long stay in Sambas also witnessed the marriage of Sultan Tengah's prince, Radin Sulaiman to Puteri Mas Ayu Bongsu, the princess of Ratu Sapundak. The royal pair had a son named Radin Bima, who would later become the second Sultan of Sambas.

Following the death of Ratu Sapundak, the throne of Sambas was succeeded by Pengiran Prabu Kenchana who appointed Radin Sulaiman as one of his advisers. Historical records narrated that Ratu Sapundak had desired to appoint Sultan Tengah as his successor due to his expertise in governance and administration, although his request was highly objected by the members of the Sambas aristocrats due to their religious differences, with the members of the then-Sambas nobility being predominantly Hindu. However, this would change in 1631, when Radin Sulaiman rose to the crown of Sambas, bearing the regal name of Sri Paduka al-Sultan Tuanku Muhammad Safiuddin I, the first Muslim ruler of the Sambas Kingdom.

Sarawak–Matan 
By 1630, the sultan departed to Matan. There, he married a local princess that gave birth to a prince, Pengiran Mangku Negara, who later became the Sultan of Matan. It was after a few years in Matan that he decided to return to Sarawak.

Return and death 
After staying a few years in Matan, the sultan decided to return to Sarawak. In 1641, he and his party settled in Batu Buaya, Santubong while en route to Sarawak. It was during this time in Batu Buaya that he was assassinated by one of his escorts. When the news of the death of the sultan arrived in Sarawak, Datu Patinggi, Shahbandar Datu, Datu Amar and Datu Temenggong departed to Santubong to complete the funeral rites of the sultan based on Bruneian royal customs. The Queen consort, Ratu Surya Kesuma decided to return to the Kingdom of Sukananda after his demise.

The kingdom was then reunified with Brunei following the death of the popular sultan, marking the end of an era. The local Sarawakian administration was then succeeded to the local governors appointed by the Bruneian monarch.

Legacy 
The final resting place of the sultan was discovered in 1993, located in Kampong Batu Buaya. A royal mausoleum was constructed in May 1995 following the rediscovery of the tomb. The monument was visited by Hassanal Bolkiah, the Sultan of Brunei during his state visit to Sarawak in 2007.

The death of the sultan witnessed the demise of the Sultanate of Sarawak. Nonetheless, his reign was instrumental to the sociopolitical framework of the western region of coastal Borneo. He established his capital in Sungai Bedil which then prospered into Kuching later in the White Rajah era. He also had incorporated the position of Datu Patinggi, Shahbandar Datu, Datu Amar and Datu Temenggong into the Sarawak administration system as can be seen today. While his missionary activities transformed the native Hindu society into a Malay Muslim community in coastal Borneo, his political marriage and alliances established new dynastic houses to the kingdoms of Sambas and Matan.

References

Bibliography 

 
 
 
 
 
 
 
 
 
 
 
 

Sarawak, Sultanate of
Sarawak, Sultanate of
Sarawak, Sultanate of
Sarawak, Sultanate of
Sarawak, Sultanate of
Sarawak, Sultanate of
Sarawak, Sultanate of
Sarawak, Sultanate of
Sarawak, Sultanate of
Sarawak, Sultanate of
Sarawak, Sultanate of
Sarawak, Sultanate of
Sarawak, Sultanate of
Sarawak, Sultanate of